Henry Arthur Fielder (26 April 1940 – 6 February 2021), sometimes credited as Harry H. Fielder or Harry Aitch Fielder, was an English actor who worked extensively in British film and television from the 1960s to the 1990s.

Career
Fielder was born in Islington, London. He appeared as an extra in many American films due to filming taking place partly or entirely in Britain. His film credits include Oliver!, Star Wars: A New Hope, McVicar, and Highlander.

He appeared as an extra in a wide range of TV shows including Doctor Who, Blake's 7, Shoestring, The Sweeney, Minder and The Professionals.

Fielder co-presented CBTV, a Thames TV programme for younger viewers, in the 1980s where he played the Security Guard, Harry, who Jim Sweeney and Steve Steen would have to sneak past at the gates of Teddington Studios.

Personal life
In 2012, Fielder published his autobiography Extra Extra, Read All About It!: My Life as a Film and TV Extra.

Fielder died on 6 February 2021 at the age of 80.

Filmography

Film

Television

References

External links
 

1940 births
2021 deaths
People from Islington (district)
Male actors from London
English male television actors
English male film actors
20th-century English male actors